Ahmed Bahnini (Arabic: أحمد بحنيني; 1909, Fes – 10 July 1971, Rabat) was a Moroccan politician who served as the 4th Prime Ministers of Morocco from 1963 to 1965 under King Hassan II. He also served as President of the Supreme Court. On July 10, 1971, during a celebration of Hassan II's birthday in Skhirat palace, Bahnini was shot dead when mutinying soldiers fired into a crowd of guests during a bloody and unsuccessful military coup attempt.

Early life 
Ahmed was born in Fez, Morocco in 1909, He studied at the University of Al-Karaouine, Abdeslam Serghini was his professor.

Career 
Ahmed Bahnini was appointed prime minister by Hassan II, a week before the promulgation of an amnesty dahir and rehabilitating well-known "collaborators" to the chagrin of the nationalists. This man, at the time of the deposition of Mohammed V had said nothing and had rallied to Mohammed Ben Aarafa, the sultan placed briefly on the throne by the French.

In a speech delivered Monday evening in Rabat, the King of Morocco proclaimed a state of exception, in accordance with article 35 of the Sherifian Constitution, and announced a revision of this Constitution, which will be submitted to referendum. received Tuesday afternoon Mr. Ahmed Bahnini, Prime Minister, who presented him with the resignation of the members of the Moroccan government. If the speech of Hassan II was welcomed with "satisfaction" by the population, as underlined in a comment Moroccan agency M.A.P., the opposition parties, Istiqlal Party and U.N.F.P., disapprove of the measures taken by the sovereign.

Death 
Ahmed Bahnini is among the victims of the many "lost" bullets of the putschists during the failed coup of July 10, 1971 in Skhirat.

References

Prime Ministers of Morocco
People from Rabat
Assassinated Moroccan politicians
Deaths by firearm in Morocco
People murdered in Morocco
1909 births
1971 deaths
20th-century Moroccan judges
People from Fez, Morocco
University of al-Qarawiyyin alumni